Armas Petter "Pekka" Kuvaja (15 June 1921, Heinävesi, Finland – 21 November 2003 in Tampere, Finland) was a Finnish cross-country skier who competed in the late 1940s and early 1950s.

He was born in Heinävesi and died in Tampere.

In the 50 km event at the Winter Olympics, he finished seventh in 1948 and ninth in 1952. Also, in 1954, he became the first non-Swede to finish first in the Vasaloppet.

Cross-country skiing results

Olympic Games

References

External links
Olympic 50 km cross country skiing results: 1948-64

1921 births
2003 deaths
People from Heinävesi
Finnish male cross-country skiers
Olympic cross-country skiers of Finland
Cross-country skiers at the 1948 Winter Olympics
Cross-country skiers at the 1952 Winter Olympics
Sportspeople from South Savo
20th-century Finnish people